The women's high jump event at the 1996 World Junior Championships in Athletics was held in Sydney, Australia, at International Athletic Centre on 23 and 25 August.

Medalists

Results

Final
25 August

Qualifications
23 Aug

Group A

Group B

Participation
According to an unofficial count, 24 athletes from 20 countries participated in the event.

References

High jump
High jump at the World Athletics U20 Championships